Ogaryova Street, Number 6 is a 1980 Soviet crime film directed by Boris Grigoryev.

Plot 
Large theft took place at one jewelry factory in the Moscow region, and two murders and an attempted rape were committed in Moscow. Kostenko saw the connection between these crimes and went to Sukhumi.

Cast 
 Vasily Lanovoy
 Georgi Yumatov
 Yevgeni Gerasimov
 Vsevolod Kuznetsov
 Dimitri Jaiani
 Gia Badridze		
 Vsevolod Larionov
 Nodar Bekauri
 Nodar Mgaloblishvili	
 Ivan Ryzhov

References

External links 
 

1980 films
1980s Russian-language films
Soviet crime thriller films
1980s crime thriller films